Valparaiso University (Valpo) is a private university in Valparaiso, Indiana.

History

Valparaiso Male and Female College

In 1859, citizens of Valparaiso were so supportive of the placement of the college that they raised $11,000 to encourage the Methodist Church to locate there. The school opened on September 21, 1859, to 75 students, and was one of the first coeducational colleges in the nation. Students paid tuition expenses of $8 per term (three terms per year), plus nearby room and board costs of approximately $2 per week. Instruction at the college actually began with young children, and most of the students were in elementary and grade levels. Courses at the collegiate level included math, literature, history, sciences, and philosophy. Courses stressing the Christian faith included "moral philosophy" and "moral science." During the Civil War, most of the men (both students and administrative members) enrolled in the army. Further difficulties arose In 1867, when Indiana passed a bill that provided state support for public education, adding competition for students. Moreover, the Methodists’ broad statewide efforts toward higher education meant none of their schools were self-sustaining. The combination of factors proved too much to overcome for the Male and Female College, and the school closed in 1871.

Northern Indiana Normal School and Business Institute

The school, reopened by Henry Baker Brown in 1873, was named the Northern Indiana Normal School and Business Institute. In 1900, the school was renamed Valparaiso College and gained its current university status after being rechartered in 1906.

Valparaiso College, then Valparaiso University

Henry Baker Brown bought the American College of Medicine and Surgery from Northwestern University; he later changed the name to Chicago College of Medicine and Surgery. Students could save money by spending their first two medical college years in Valparaiso.

In 1905 the university formed an affiliation with Chicago College of Dental Surgery to provide dental education for its students. For the next two decades, Valpo gained a national reputation as an economical institution of higher learning, earning its positive nickname The Poor Man’s Harvard. At the height of enrollment in 1907, it was the second-largest school in the nation, behind only Harvard University. In 1914, monthly literary magazine The Torch was founded; it became the university's weekly student newspaper in 1915.

The university began intercollegiate athletic competition in 1916. Valpo's first game was a basketball game against the Chicago YMCA Training School, in which VU fielded players from intramural teams.

In 1917, World War I and the death of President Brown took its toll, and the school was forced into bankruptcy. Valparaiso University sold the Chicago College of Medicine and Surgery to Loyola University Chicago. In 1923, a fire destroyed the original 1860 Old College Building, and VU could not afford to clean the site. This was one of many financial problems Valparaiso faced in 1923, as President Horace M. Evans tried to settle a $375,000 debt. Evans appealed to the Rockefeller Foundation and other wealthy individuals before asking the Indiana state legislature to make VU public. The legislature refused, and Evans almost sold the university to the Invisible Hand of the Ku Klux Klan, but the deal was stopped due to "legal technicalities", likely cited to save face for both organizations.

Valparaiso University was eventually bought by the Lutheran University Association, a conglomerate of National Lutheran Education Alliance and American Luther League.

Lutheran revival

In July 1925 the Lutheran University Association, affiliated with the Lutheran Church–Missouri Synod, took over ownership of the school. The association was a group of clergy and church laity that saw promise in the school and wanted to create an academic institution not controlled by any church denomination. Valparaiso is still operated by the Lutheran University Association, and remains an independent Lutheran institution that enjoys close relations with the Lutheran Church–Missouri Synod and Evangelical Lutheran Church in America.

On March 13, 1929, the North Central Association of Colleges and Schools accredited the university. Two years later, President Kreinheder created the Valparaiso University Guild, a volunteer and philanthropy organization to help students, and in 1934 the Alumni Association began operation. The university's College of Engineering started a cooperative education program with Purdue University in 1938. At the end of the 1930s, the university completed a new gymnasium. In 1941, VU instituted its Department of Art. Coincident with the beginning of World War II, Valparaiso University renamed its yearbook from The Uhlan (a German soldier) to The Beacon. The next year Valpo changed its athletic team name from the Uhlans to the Crusaders.

Modern era

In 1940, O. P. Kretzmann became president of the university. During his 28 years in office, he marshaled significant changes, many of which remain in place. The large oak tree occupying this land was named "Merlin" and remains a central feature of campus. This purchase would transform campus, as the university moved to its current location over the course of many years.

Kretzmann increased enrollment from 400 to more than 4,000. Academic rigor increased along with enrollment. VU created its Honor Code in 1943 and remains in place today, as students continue to write the code on top of assignments. After the Second World War, Valparaiso offered its first four-year degrees: mechanical, civil, and electrical engineering. On November 27, 1956, the Chapel-Auditorium burned down. The university quickly rebuilt its worship space: the Chapel of the Resurrection was dedicated on September 27, 1959. VU installed a subcritical nuclear reactor in 1958, and in the 1970s the University Branch of the United States Atomic Energy Commission called Valpo's nuclear physics lab "a model for all small universities wishing to provide excellent training in the field of undergraduate physics."

President Kretzmann founded Christ College, the honors college of Valparaiso University, in 1967. Christ College was only the third such honors college in the nation. The campus radio station WVUR-FM began broadcasting in 1960. Robert F. Kennedy spoke before 5,000 people in 1968 at VU while campaigning, and in the same year, the university began its long-standing international study centers in Cambridge, England, and Reutlingen, Germany. During student protests in 1970, Kinsey Hall burned. The first class of the College of Nursing graduated in 1971. In 1976, Valparaiso University began NCAA Division I competition.

In 1991, Valpo became home to the Lilly Fellows Program, a national program that supports young scholar-teachers, during its inaugural year. This program has grown to almost 100 universities. The 1998 men's basketball team reached the Sweet Sixteen of the Division I national tournament. In 2002, a new international study center was established in Hangzhou, China. Phi Beta Kappa established a chapter at Valparaiso University in 2004. In 2013 the university completed a solar furnace and research facility, the only undergraduate institution to operate a solar furnace, and one of only five solar furnaces in the US.

In 2008, Mark Heckler became Valparaiso University's 18th president. During his initial years in office, Heckler led the "most comprehensive and collaborative strategic-planning endeavor in the University’s history". The plan includes goals such as increasing enrollment to 6,000 students, multiple building initiatives, and increased global engagement. President Heckler announced his retirement as of September 2020, and Colette Irwin-Knott was named as Interim President. José Padilla became President-Elect on January 1, 2021, and assumed the university presidency on March 1, 2021. In 2021, Valpo adopted Beacons as its athletic team name.

Since 2015, Valparaiso University has struggled with enrollment and retention of students. The student population dropped from 4,544 in Fall 2015 to 2,939 in Fall 2022. The university's enrollment and budgetary problems reached an acute point during and after the COVID-19 pandemic, resulting in the discontinuances of multiple undergraduate programs (secondary education major, theatre major and minor, Chinese minor, French major, Greek and Roman studies major and minor). Due to financial stress, the university also laid off numerous lecturers and more than a dozen other tenure-track faculty in remaining programs, and offered a retirement incentive buy-out package to long-term faculty and staff to incentivize voluntary departures. Meanwhile, the student retention rate also fell to 77%.

Amid these enrollment struggles, the university has also faced controversy. In 2021, the Indiana Attorney General's office announced an investigation into the university's Confucius Institute, alleging that it promotes Chinese propaganda. The university closed the institute and denied the allegations. In 2023, the Board of Directors decided to sell three paintings, including one by Georgia O'Keeffe, from the Brauer Museum of Art in order to renovate freshman dorms. This raised opposition from the namesake of the museum and protest from some faculty and students about the erosion of the arts.

Campus

Old campus

The Old Campus of Valparaiso University is adjacent to and a part of the historic downtown district of the city. Old Campus is the site of the School of Law, made up of Wesemann Hall and Heritage Hall. Heritage was the oldest remaining building on the campus, and was put on the National Register of Historic Places in 1976. In 2009, the school started a restoration project, essentially rebuilding the facility. The school's fraternities and the Kade-Duesenberg German House and Cultural Center are on old campus as was the Martin Luther King, Jr., Cultural Center before acts of vandalism and arson destroyed the building in 2009. Old Campus is also the site of Valpo's Doppler weather radar. North of Old Campus is Lebien Hall, home to the College of Nursing and Health Professions.

New campus

Beginning in the 1950s, the school expanded eastward to occupy what is now known as "new campus". Today, it is center of the university, home to thousands of students in nine dormitories as well as most of the academic buildings.

At the center of campus is the Chapel of the Resurrection, a -high building that is the home of Valparaiso University's many worship services and convocations. Built on the highest elevation on the university's campus, it has been a Northwest Indiana landmark since 1959. In 2011, Rev. Mark and Kathy Helge gave a $15-million gift for a major expansion to the chapel. The  addition opened in the fall of 2015.

The Christopher Center Library (built 2004) houses over 500,000 books and numerous video and audio resources. It is a popular place for students to gather and study. The Valparaiso University Center for the Arts (VUCA) offers multiple performance facilities, which are most notably used by students to produce full scale theatrical performances every year. The performances and exhibits in the Center for the Arts are always open to the public, and the Center houses the nationally renowned Brauer Museum of Art.

Kallay-Christopher Hall opened in 2004 and is home to the Department of Geography and Meteorology. Kallay-Christopher has an observation deck and large weather lab facilities. Adjoining Kallay-Christopher Hall is Schnabel Hall, which is home to communications students, WVUR-FM, the university's student-run radio station, and VUTV, the university's student-run television station.

The Donald V. Fites Innovations Center, an addition to the College of Engineering's Gellersen Hall, was completed in the summer of 2011. The $13-million, LEED-certified building has two suites of labs that support advanced undergraduate research in areas such as materials science and energy systems. The Department of Physics and Astronomy has a  computerized reflecting telescope to aid in NASA research and VisBox-X2, a virtual reality system used to immerse students in a visualized three-dimensional image.

The  Arts and Sciences Building, adjacent to the Christopher Center for Library and Information Resources, opened in 2012 and houses classrooms and offices for faculty in the College of Arts and Sciences.

The James S. Markiewicz Solar Energy Research Facility was dedicated in September 2013. Professors and students use the energy research facility, profiled in The Atlantic, in developing methods to produce low-carbon magnesium with 90 percent less fossil fuel energy than standard production methods.

The , $74 million Harre Union opened in 2009. Named in honor of former University President Alan F. Harre, who retired in 2008, it is more than three times the size of the previous union. The Harre Union has consolidated all dining services on campus, with the exception of the law school. It has room for all student organizations, as well as a new bookstore, lounge areas, student mailboxes for every student on campus, entertainment areas, a large ballroom, a career center, and an outdoor terrace overlooking the chapel. The design architect was Sasaki Associates, Inc. and the architect of record was Design Organization.

In June 2013, the Duesenberg Welcome Center on campus was completed for visitors coming to campus. The creation of this building was funded by Valparaiso University alumni, Richard and Phyllis Duesenberg.

A new residence hall, Beacon Hall, opened in 2014.

A "STEM village" of three new buildings will soon replace Neils Science Center and become the new home for the biology, chemistry, and physics departments. The first of these buildings was completed in 2017. Neils Science Center was erected in 1974 and includes a planetarium, greenhouse, and a now decommissioned sub-critical nuclear reactor that helped the facility receive an Atomic Energy Commission citation as a model undergraduate physics laboratory. The new  Center for the Sciences: Chemistry and Biochemistry opened in fall 2017.

Academics

Undergraduate programs
Valparaiso is organized into five undergraduate colleges: Arts and Sciences, Business, Engineering, Nursing and Health Professions, and Christ College.

College of Arts and Sciences
The College of Arts and Sciences integrates liberal arts and professional development. It provides hands-on, undergraduate research opportunities and internships to accompany the classroom experience. With more than 70 academic programs in 21 departments, the College of Arts and Sciences supplies the liberal arts core for all programs.

College of Business
The College of Business is among the elite 25 percent of undergraduate business programs nationally accredited by the AACSB International — The Association to Advance Collegiate Schools of Business. The College of Business offers focused majors in accounting, business analytics, finance, international business, management, and marketing. Starting 2018 Fall, the college of business is offering a new major and minor in supply chain and logistics management.

College of Engineering
The 2021 U.S. News & World Report named the College of Engineering the 13th-best undergraduate engineering program among institutions that do not have doctorate programs. The College of Engineering won the 2012 Engineering Award presented by the National Council of Examiners for Engineering. About 90 percent of undergraduates complete the program within four years. The college provides several service learning opportunities as well as undergraduate research opportunities.

College of Nursing and Health Professions
The Virtual Nursing Learning Center offers patient stations complete with interactive mannequins, beds and equipment simulating a hospital environment. The baccalaureate, master's, and DNP programs at Valpo are accredited by the Commission on Collegiate Nursing Education.

Christ College
Christ College is the interdisciplinary Honors College of Valparaiso University. Known on campus as "CC", Christ College was chartered by President O. P. Kretzmann in 1967. In 1964, Kretzmann convened a committee to plan a successor to the Directed Studies Program, which was established to better serve the influx of gifted students to the institution. This new college within VU would seek students who had "a passion for learning and the pursuit of excellence generally."

The Christ College curriculum was to be based, in part, on the University of Chicago's "Liberal Arts" core model. Incoming freshmen would read classical texts and use the Socratic Method to discover "that they did not know what they thought they knew." In later years, courses that transcend assignment to a particular academic discipline challenged students to explore important questions from an imaginative perspective. This structure remains intact as every freshman enrolls in the Freshman Program, which consists of a 16-credit, two semester course that introduces students to classic works of history, literature, art, music, philosophy, religion and theology, and social science.

In addition to classes, a number of traditions create camaraderie and foster the intellectual formation of students. The most notable of these annual events are the fall Christ College Freshman Production and the spring Christ College Oxford Debates. The Freshman Production is an original play or musical that is written, scored, choreographed, directed, produced, and performed exclusively by members of the Christ College freshman class. The Christ College Oxford Debates are a series of formal debates in which two groups of students represent either the affirmative or negative side of a topic they have researched for five or six weeks. Following debate, the debate moderator asks the audience members to "vote their minds" and decide the winner of the debate. Another notable academic opportunity offered by Christ College is the Student Scholarship Symposium, in which undergraduates present research in a formal lecture setting. It features student-selected research projects, from a diverse set of academic fields, delivered in a critical and interactive environment. Students in the college often spend a semester studying at one of Valpo's overseas study centers; many take a Christ College Abroad course, which are led by faculty each spring break.

Approximately 90 students, or 10 percent of the university's incoming class, are admitted each year. Students in the honors college concurrently enroll in another undergraduate college at VU, and can complete their study with a major or a minor in humanities to complement the major received in their main field of study. In 2013, Peter Kanelos became the fifth Dean of Christ College, succeeding Mel Piehl. Piehl had led the college for ten years after Mark Schwehn stepped down from the position. The fall of 2017, Professor Jennifer Prough became interim Dean after Peter Kanelos stepped down, becoming the first female Dean of CC. The next Dean, Susan VanZanten, took office in 2018. She stepped down in July 2021. Since, Jennifer Prough has become the interim dean once more.

Graduate school
Valparaiso University offers a variety of master's programs.

Law school

Founded in 1879 the Law School was accredited by the ABA in 1929 and the AALS in 1930. In 2010, Valparaiso Law Students had an 83 percent first-time bar pass rate. After a censure by the American Bar Association in October 2016, the university sought to downsize the law school or merge it with another institution. In November 2017, the university announced the law school would not enroll a new class in 2018, and in October 2018 the university announced it will close the law school and is developing a plan to allow the remaining students to complete their degrees.

Study abroad
More than a third of all undergraduate students study abroad, placing Valparaiso University among the top 40 institutions in the country. VU offers more than 40 study-abroad programs around the world, and the duration of study-abroad programs ranges from a week to a full academic year. In 2013, the U.S. Department of State named VU as one of the colleges and universities that produced the most Fulbright scholars. Between 2003 and 2013, 26 Valparaiso students studied abroad as a Fulbright scholar.

Valpo maintains four global study centers (Cambridge, England; Reutlingen, Germany; Hangzhou, China; and San José, Costa Rica), each of which provides group trips and excursions, a course on the life and culture of the host country, and specialized housing, all under the guidance of an on-site resident director. Valpo partners with International Education Programs, or IEP. Other sites students can study in include Athens, Greece; Granada, Spain; Zaragoza, Spain; Cergy-Pointoise, France; La Rochelle, France; Paris, France; Limerick, Ireland; Newcastle, Australia; Rottenburg am Neckar, Germany; Tübingen, Germany; Chiang Mai, Thailand; Delhi, India; Coimbatore, India; Osaka, Japan; Viña Del Mar, Chile; Puebla, Mexico; and Windhoek, Namibia.

Distance learning
The university offers online degree programs such as the Post-MSN Doctorate in Nursing Practice. The accelerated degree programs are Web-based and allow versatile learning.

Reputation and rankings

In the 2022 U.S. News & World Report university rankings, Valpo was ranked 176 among national universities. U.S. News & World Report rated Valpo 43rd in "Best Value Schools", #186 in Top Performers on Social Mobility, and #15 in Best Undergraduate Engineering Programs.

Washington Monthly, which publishes its College Guide annually, ranked Valpo #149 for social mobility, #182 for research, and #291 for service among national universities.

Student body

Students
Valparaiso University Students are from geographically diverse backgrounds. Of the nearly 3,000 students, only one-third is from the school's home state of Indiana. The remainder come from almost every other state of the United States and from nearly 50 countries. Over half graduate in the top quarter of their high school class, and 77 percent return to Valpo after their freshman year. Annually, more than $26 million is awarded by the university to more than 80 percent of the student body, which is administered based on factors such as community involvement, interests, recommendations, and personality, as well as grade point average, class ranking, and standardized test scores.

Sixty-one percent of Valparaiso University students live on the school's city campus, as University regulations require nearly all students who do not have senior status to live in residence halls. Twenty-seven percent of students are Lutheran, and 75 percent participate in faith-related activities. Valpo supports more than 100 student-administered organizations, clubs, and activities. Fifty percent participate in intramural athletics, and more than 1,000 students give more than 45,000 hours of community service to the region each year.

Greek life
More than 25 percent of Valpo students are members of one of the school's ten national fraternities or six national sororities. The Greek Life community is coordinated by the "Interfraternity Council" for fraternities and by the "Panhellenic Council" for the sororities. Many of the fraternities were local until the 1950s, when they were accepted as chapters into national and international fraternities. The sororities had no national affiliation until 1998.

In the 2013-2014 Fraternity & Sorority Life Annual Report, more than 10,000 hours of community service and $45,000 of financial report to local and national non-profits were reported. All but one organization had a cumulative GPA above 3.0 during the spring semester, and the average GPA across all Greek Life was 3.247.

In 2015, the university announced plans to construct new housing for all five sororities. The two-story,  building will occupy a site west of the Athletics-Recreation Center. Each sorority will occupy a 25-bed portion of the complex and share a single chapter room. Construction will begin in March 2015 and be completed by the end of the year.

Fraternities
 Kappa Alpha Psi
 Lambda Chi Alpha
 Phi Delta Theta
 Phi Kappa Psi
 Phi Mu Alpha Sinfonia
 Phi Sigma Kappa
 Pi Kappa Alpha
 Sigma Chi
 Sigma Phi Epsilon
 Sigma Pi

Sororities
Alpha Gamma Delta
Chi Omega
 Gamma Phi Beta
 Kappa Delta
 Kappa Kappa Gamma
 Pi Beta Phi
 Sigma Lambda Gamma

Honor societies
Valparaiso hosts chapters of all major honors fraternities, including Mortar Board National College Senior Honor Society.

 Alpha Epsilon Delta
 Alpha Lambda Delta
 Alpha Psi Omega
 Beta Gamma Sigma
 Chi Sigma Iota
 Gamma Theta Upsilon
 Eta Kappa Nu
 Eta Sigma Phi
 Kappa Delta Pi
 Lambda Pi Eta
 Sigma Alpha Iota 
 Sigma Theta Tau
 Sigma Tau Delta
 Tau Beta Pi
 Theta Alpha Kappa
 Pi Delta Phi
 Pi Sigma Alpha
 Phi Alpha Theta
 Phi Beta Kappa
 Phi Epsilon Kappa
 Psi Chi
 Chi Epsilon Pi

Student activism
Valparaiso University has a history of student activism. Prominent examples with long-lasting effects include:

Kinsey Hall fire

While many colleges amended or canceled the remainder of the 1969–1970 school year after the Kent State shootings due to unrest, the Valparaiso administration ignored student calls for seminars and forums about violence at other campuses. A large group of students then organized a protest march from the campus Victory Bell to the Porter County courthouse. Continued protests led to discussions between the administration and student leaders. When these talks failed, still-unidentified students set fire to the empty Kinsey Hall administrative building in the early morning. The fire destroyed the building.

Student-led restoration of engineering college

The existence of Valparaiso University's College of Engineering is the result of student activism. The university's engineering program had been reduced to a two-year associate degree in response to reduced enrollment during economic depression, which dominated the 1930s. When students began inquiring in 1948 regarding the possibility of restoring a four-year degree program, university president O.P. Kretzmann cited a lack of space and lack of resources to build a new facility. Students responded with an offer to build the new facility if he would guarantee faculty positions, to which the president agreed. The students constructed the facility themselves using their engineering education and an intense fundraising campaign, and by 1951 the new College of Engineering was again granting four-year bachelor's degrees. The building still exists today, home to the Art department. This story received national attention and was turned into a feature-length film entitled Venture of Faith.

Student media 
Valparaiso University's student media organizations (WVUR: The Source, VUTV, The Beacon, The Torch, and The Lighter) are all award-winning and long-standing. Though the organizations are all award-winning, many of their student participants have also won awards for their work in the student-run media organizations.

Athletics

Valpo's colors are brown and gold and athletic teams are known as the Beacons. Most athletic events are held in the Athletics-Recreation Center (ARC), which is the primary sporting facility on campus. Valparaiso's eighteen teams and nearly 600 student athletes mostly participate in NCAA Division I (I-FCS for football) in the Missouri Valley Conference. Valparaiso competes in four sports that the MVC does not sponsor. The football team plays in the Pioneer Football League at Brown Field. Men's swimming and men's tennis compete in the Summit League, and bowling (a women-only sport at the NCAA level) competes in the Southland Bowling League.

In 1942, Valparaiso University fielded the tallest basketball team in the world, and the so-called "Valparaiso Giants" or "The World's Tallest Team" played at Madison Square Garden in the 1944–1945 season. The VU football team played in the Cigar Bowl on New Year's Day 1951. Valpo is also known for its men's basketball head coach Homer Drew and his son Bryce Drew, who led the team to its Sweet Sixteen appearance in the 1998 NCAA basketball tournament by making "The Shot", a three-point shot as time expired, to beat favored Ole Miss by one point. Bryce Drew was named head coach in the spring of 2011. Valparaiso is also the home of the National Lutheran Basketball Tournament.

The men's soccer team won the Horizon League regular season conference championship in 2011. Men's basketball followed with a 2011 Horizon League crown of its own while the baseball and softball teams both won regular season and Horizon League Tournament titles, representing the conference in the NCAA Tournament. In addition, the bowling team earned a berth at the NCAA Championships in just its third season of existence. In addition, Head Coach Carin Avery led the women's volleyball team to great success recently. In their 2014–2015 season they pursued their 13th consecutive 20-win season. They were one of 10 programs nationwide to have won at least 20 matches in each of the previous 12 years, during which time Avery led the team to three conference regular season and tournament championships, as well as advancing to the NCAA Tournament on three occasions. In the spring of 2013 the men's golf team won the Horizon League Championship and advanced to the NCAA Tournament.

NCAA Division I teams include baseball (men), basketball, bowling (women), cross country, football (men), golf, soccer, softball (women), swimming, tennis, track & field, and volleyball. The university has cheerleading and spirit squads, as well as several intramural and club sports: flag football, innertube water polo, miniature golf, sand volleyball, soccer, softball, swimming, tennis, ultimate frisbee, and volleyball.

On February 11, 2021, Valparaiso announced it would retire the "Crusaders" nickname because of the "negative connotation and violence associated with the Crusader imagery". On August 10, 2021 "Beacons" was announced as the new nickname.

Notable people

Faculty
Marcia Bunge, theologian in Christ College from 1997 to 2012 who researches children and childhood in religion and ethics
Faisal Kutty, law; internationally recognized scholar, writer and public speaker
Gilbert Meilaender, ethics and theology; held the Duesenberg Chair in Christian Ethics from 1996 to 2014, as of 2020 Senior Research Professor of Theology. Also serves as a Fellow of the Hastings Center and as Paul Ramsey Fellow at the Notre Dame Center for Ethics and Culture
Walter Wangerin, Jr., English and theology; National Book Award winning author of The Book of the Dun Cow

Alumni
 
R.J.Q. Adams, M.A. 1969, historian
Adam Amin, ESPN play-by-play broadcaster
Roy E. Ayers, member of the United States House of Representatives and as the 11th Governor of Montana
Fredrick Barton, novelist and film critic
Chris Bauman, entertainment entrepreneur and independent music activist   
Frederick M. Bernthal, Assistant Secretary of State for Oceans and International Environmental and Scientific Affairs from 1988 to 1990
Anthony Bimba (1894–1982), Lithuanian-American Communist historian and newspaper editor
Beulah Bondi, actress
Mikhail Borodin, Soviet and Comintern representative to China
LeRoy Earl Brophey Sr., Minnesota state representative and lawyer
Alys McKey Bryant, aviation pioneer
John E. Cashman, Wisconsin State Senator
JoBe Cerny, owner, Cerny/American Creative; character actor and voice of the Pillsbury Doughboy
Paul Chambers, CNN anchor/film critic
Stoyan Christowe,  writer, journalist, member of the Vermont Senate from 1959 to 1972.
Patrick Roger Cleary, founder of Cleary University
Jay Christopher, cofounder of The Pampered Chef
Thurman C. Crook, a United States representative from Indiana 
 Andre "Add-2" Daniels, rapper 
Blanche Evans Dean, naturalist, conservationist, and author; honored in the Alabama Women's Hall of Fame
Marcellus Dorwin, Wisconsin State Assemblyman
Scott Drew, College basketball coach and NCAA National Champion
Bryce Drew, College basketball coach and former NBA player
David W. Dugan, United States Federal District Court Judge, Southern District of Illinois
Michael Essany, television talk show host
Don Fites, chairman and CEO (retired), Caterpillar Inc.
Edward Grassman, Wisconsin State Assemblyman
Walter Hunt, Wisconsin State Senator
Samuel B. Huston, former attorney and state legislator in Oregon
Omer Stokes Jackson, 28th Indiana Attorney General
Andrieus A. Jones, Senator, supported New Mexico statehood (1885)
Reuben Kahn, immunologist and inventor of a test for syphilis
Barbara Ann Kipfer, prolific linguist and lexicographer
Keith Kizer, former executive director, Nevada State Athletic Commission, and Nevada Chief Deputy Attorney General
Moses Lairy, Justice of the Indiana Supreme Court
Edgar E. Lien, Wisconsin State Assemblyman
Cal Luther, college basketball coach
John Lutz, actor, "30 Rock;" writer, "Saturday Night Live"
Jacki Lyden, a senior correspondent at NPR and author of Daughter of the Queen of Sheba
Idael Makeever, poet
William March, novelist, Company K, The Bad Seed
Lloyd McClendon, MLB player and manager
James F. McDowell, Wisconsin State Assemblyman
H. Lane Mitchell, public works commissioner in Shreveport, Louisiana, from 1934 to 1968; graduated from Valparaiso with degree in engineering
George William Norris, United States Senator from Nebraska and father of the Tennessee Valley Authority 
Eugene E. Parker, sports attorney and agent to Larry Fitzgerald, Deion Sanders, Hines Ward, Greg Jennings, Ndamukong Suh, Michael Crabtree, and many other NFL players
Rebecca R. Pallmeyer, United States federal judge
William Edmunds Plummer, Wisconsin State Assemblyman
Caleb Powers, United States Representative from Kentucky; Secretary of State of Kentucky; convicted as an accessory to murder of the state governor 
William P. Richardson (1864–1945), co-founder and first Dean of Brooklyn Law School
David Ruprecht, host, Supermarket Sweep, Real People
Paul Schrage, designer of the "Golden Arches" logo; senior vice-president and Chief Marketing Officer McDonald's Corporation, 1967–1997
Kathi Seifert, Executive Vice President Kimberly-Clark 1991–2004, one of Forbes Magazine's top 10 businesswomen 2001
Benjamin Shively, U.S. Senator from Indiana, 1909–1916
Judith Sherman, multi-Grammy award-winning record producer
James Monroe Smith, president of Louisiana State University, 1930-1939
Len Small, 26th Governor of Illinois
Rene Steinke, novelist of The Fires and Holy Skirts
Donald Edgar Tewes, United States Representative from Wisconsin 
Lowell Thomas, author of over 50 books, a war correspondent during World War I who made T.E. Lawrence Lawrence of Arabia internationally famous in print and by filming him; pioneer broadcast journalist; world traveler; 1976 Presidential Medal of Freedom 
Jill Long Thompson, United States Representative from Indiana 1989–1995, Under Secretary of Agriculture for Rural Development 1995–2001, 2010 Presidential appointee to board overseeing the federal Farm Credit Administration. 
Frederick "Fuzzy" Thurston, All-pro guard for the Green Bay Packers, 1959–67
Jim Wacker, former football coach at the University of Minnesota
 Austin Walton, certified NBA agent and owner of Walton Sports Management Group
Otis Wingo, U.S. representative from Arkansas's 4th congressional district, 1913–1930 
Lowell Yerex, aviation entrepreneur
Ginger Zee, meteorologist, Good Morning America and ABC News

References

External links

Valparaiso University Athletics website

 
Lutheran universities and colleges in the United States
Buildings and structures in Valparaiso, Indiana
Educational institutions established in 1859
Private universities and colleges in Indiana
Northwest Indiana
Education in Porter County, Indiana
Tourist attractions in Porter County, Indiana
1859 establishments in Indiana